Michael L. J. Apuzzo (born May 22, 1940) is an American academic neurological surgeon, the Edwin M. Todd/Trent H. Wells, Jr. Professor Emeritus of Neurological Surgery and Radiation Oncology, Biology, and Physics at the Keck School of Medicine, of the University of Southern California. He is also editor emeritus of the peer-reviewed journals World Neurosurgery and Neurosurgery. He is distinguished adjunct professor of neurosurgery at the Yale School of Medicine, distinguished professor of advanced neurosurgery and neuroscience and senior advisor, at the Neurological Institute, Wexner Medical School, The Ohio State University, and adjunct professor of neurosurgery, Weill Cornell Medicine, Department of Neurological Surgery & Weill Cornell Brain and Spine Center.

Early life and education
Apuzzo is the son of a maritime family with roots in Amalfi, Italy (Dominic John Apuzzo, a precision machinist and craftsman) and Vienna, Austria (Ann Janet Lorenz, a registered nurse). Born in New Haven, Connecticut where he attended the Hopkins Grammar School, continued his academic studies at Yale College and obtained his medical degree at the Boston University. After completing his general surgery training at McGill's Royal Victoria Hospital in Montreal, he returned to the Yale School of Medicine to complete his neurosurgical residency at Yale New Haven Hospital, West Haven Veteran's Administration Hospital, and Hartford Hospital, along with fellowships in neurophysiology and neuro-pathology. During that time, Apuzzo obtained training in nuclear, submarine and deep sea diving medical specialties at the Naval Submarine Base New London in Groton, Connecticut.

Military service
Following training in Groton, Connecticut, he served as a medical and deep sea diving officer on the USS Robert E. Lee (SSBN-601), one of the original five nuclear-powered fleet ballistic missile submarines as a part of submarine Squadron 14 based in Holy Loch, Scotland. This squadron was assigned to implement the deterrent mission of NATO (North Atlantic Treaty Organization), serving as a submarine platform for sixteen Polaris A-3 multiple nuclear warhead intercontinental ballistic missiles. This duty consisted of multiple 90- to 120-day submerged patrols to polar regions, the Mediterranean Sea, and Black Sea.

Professional life
He joined the faculty at the University of Southern California School of Medicine in 1973, where he established a central nervous system immunology and cellular biology laboratory. There, he primarily focused on brain diseases such as tumors, epilepsy, Parkinson's disease and neuropsychiatric disorders. At the Los Angeles County General Hospital, he developed early refinements of microsurgical techniques for the management of intracranial neoplasms. Specifically, he described and advocated complex midline transcerebral microsurgical corridors to the brain's centrally located third ventricle, which ultimately resulted in popularizing these approaches internationally. He helped establish the microscope as a regular and essential component of the general neurosurgical armamentarium. He was appointed Professor in 1980.

Currently, Apuzzo is the Edwin M. Todd/Trent H. Wells, Jr. Professor Emeritus of Neurological Surgery and Radiation Oncology, Biology, and Physics at the Keck School of Medicine, of the University of Southern California, distinguished adjunct professor of neurosurgery at the Yale School of Medicine, distinguished professor of advanced neurosurgery and neuroscience and senior advisor, at the Neurological Institute, Wexner Medical School, The Ohio State University, and adjunct professor of neurosurgery, Weill Cornell Medicine, Department of Neurological Surgery & Weill Cornell Brain and Spine Center. He was director of Neurosurgery at the Kenneth Norris, Jr. Cancer Hospital and Research Institute, senior clinical director of surgical neuro-oncology, and director of the Gamma Unit Facility at the USC University Hospital and neurosurgical director of the Norris CyberKnife Facility at the Norris Hospital.

Clinical and research activities
Apuzzo was a leader in the development and employment of imaging directed stereotactic neurosurgery in 1979. In the laboratory and clinic, he developed and refined prototype stereotactic systems and technical adjuvants. These created a mode of intracranial navigation at a new level of precision and safety. He introduced the computer as an intraoperative neurosurgical tool and reintroduced intracranial endoscopy as a technical adjunct. Though not primarily a radiosurgeon, he introduced and developed rotational dynamic radiosurgery techniques and performed the first procedure in America using these methods for brain tumors, arteriovenous malformations, and functional disorders. Later, he worked to refine and popularize the use of fixed beam systems.

He studied functional restoration in the central nervous system and performed North America's first human stereotactic cerebral grafting research procedure for the amelioration of Parkinsonism. He conceived the term‚ 'cellular and molecular neuro-surgery' and promoted the amalgam of molecular biology and neurosurgery in the comprehension and management of neurological diseases. He developed the concept of minimally invasive neurosurgery and played a primary role in the investigation and application of vagal nerve stimulation for the management of intractable epilepsy. This method of treatment was subsequently applied to multiple neurofunctional and psychiatric disorders.

He has worked as a special consultant to the National Aeronautics and Space Administration (NASA) through the Jet Propulsion Laboratory (JPL) and the Cape Kennedy-Canaveral Facilities.

He has raised awareness of the role of nanotechnology as a neurosurgical adjuvant. He has worked in the area of advanced and specialized operating room design, as well as the concept of virtual environments for surgical simulation.

Publications and editorships
Apuzzo has made over 800 contributions to the scientific literature on surgical techniques, methods, and concepts as they apply to disorders of the human cerebrum. Major independent volumes have included: Surgery of the Third Ventricle (1987, 1998) Brain Surgery: Complication Avoidance and Management (1992), and Surgery of the Human Cerebrum (2009). Predominant themes have included surgical minimalism, technology transfer and the implementation of advanced technologies to the therapy of brain diseases.

In 1991, he was appointed editor-in-chief of the peer-reviewed journal Neurosurgery. He established the web-based "Neurosurgery-Online" and later "Operative Neurosurgery" during his term as editor-in-chief. When he completed his term in 2009, he was asked to found the society sponsored peer-reviewed journal "World Neurosurgery" and "worldneurosurgery.org" by the World Federation of Neurosurgical Societies (WFNS), a position which he fulfilled brilliantly with artistic creativity and scientific expertise, until January 2015, when he stepped down.

Internationalism and education
He has served as an advocate for international exchange of ideas. In 1989, as scientific program chair, he introduced an increased presence of international faculty and participation in the American Association of Neurological Surgeons (AANS) Annual Meeting in New Orleans, Louisiana. This practice was subsequently developed and perpetuated by the major North American neurosurgical groups in succeeding decades. As editor of Neurosurgery, he established an extensive international advisory board and increased international participation in the review and publication processes.

He subsequently traveled actively internationally initiating idea exchange and the sharing of information globally both personally and through the exploitation of digital technologies early in their availability. He subsequently was awarded membership in more than 25 international organizations. Based on these contributions, he was awarded the Founders' Laurel Award by the Congress of Neurological Surgeons (CNS) at their annual meeting in 2014.

Sports
He has served as the principal neurosurgical consultant for the University of Southern California Trojans Athletic Department and the New York Football Giants, as well as, a consultant to the NFL Commissioner and the Leagues committee on head and spinal trauma. Additionally, he has served as adviser to the National Football Leagues Committee on Head Injury.  He is also a consultant to the activities of various teams and clubs of the National Football League (NFL), Major League Baseball (MLB), the National Hockey League (NHL) and the National Basketball Association (NBA).
Beginning in 1978, based on the legacy of University of Michigan's Richard C. Schnieder, he initiated activities to establish the role of neurosurgery in the arena of organized sport. Initially, at the University of Southern California, he established an active role in the areas of head protection, injury prevention, assessment and treatment with athletic trainer Byron Hansen and later Russ Romano and a succession of coaches and athletic directors at that institution. Subsequently, he worked to establish injury management protocols with the National Institutes of Health (NIH) and National Football League (NFL).

As editor of Neurosurgery, he established a section on sport which focused on traumatic brain injury in all sports. Later, as special adviser to the National Football League Committee on traumatic brain injury, he worked to establish injury prevention recognition and management protocols that are now adopted under the Commissioners Paul Tagliabue and Roger Goodell. In later years, his relationship with the NFL as a special consultant to the New York Giants while acting as editor-in-chief of the journal came under question in investigations led by PBS and the New York Times. In particular, the NFL’s Mild Traumatic Brain Injury Committee had published all 13 of its publications in Neurosurgery as he maintained professional and financial ties to the organization, and over the objections of reviewers.

Recognition
Apuzzo has served as honored guest laureate for the Congress of Neurological Surgeons. He was awarded the William Beecher Scoville Prize for neurosurgery by the World Federation of Neurosurgical Societies (WFNS). He was awarded the Van Heck Prize by the Belgian National Foundation for Scientific Research for work in the treatment of untreatable diseases. He has been honored by the World Health Organization (WHO), World Federation of Neurosurgical Societies, Queen Sophia of Spain with the Sixto Obrador Medal, and Sweden's National Center for Research and Higher Education in Medicine, the Karolinska Institutet, with the Herbert Olivecrona Award. He received a Doctorate honoris pro causa from the 85-member Italian National University Consortium administered by the Suor Orsola Benincasa University of Naples. He received the University Medal from Boston University for unusual contributions to the field of medicine and the advancement of surgery of the central nervous system and the Gold Medal from the University of Messina in Italy for his contributions to neurosurgery, medicine, internationalization and humanities. He is the recipient of Norway's Vilhelm Magnus Medal and Italy's Francesco Durante International Prize.
The Congress of Neurological Surgeons had established the "Michael L. J. Apuzzo Lecture on Creativity and Innovation" as a keynote lecture at its annual meeting. The "Apuzzo Prize for Creativity and Innovation" has been established at both the Boston University and Keck Schools of Medicine. He is the 2014 recipient of the Congress of Neurological Surgeons' "Founders Laurel Award". He was honored by the Ohio State University with a Doctor of Science degree in May 2015.

In May 2009, the University of Southern California's Department of Neurological Surgery and the Keck School of Medicine established the Michael L.J. Apuzzo Professorship for Advanced Neurological Surgery. The professorship is endowed by Ernest A. Bates.

See also
 World Neurosurgery
 List of Hopkins School people

References

1940 births
Living people
American neurosurgeons
Boston University School of Medicine alumni
Yale College alumni
Physicians from New Haven, Connecticut